The Libyco-Punic Mausoleum of Dougga (Mausoleum of Atban) is an ancient mausoleum located in Dougga, Tunisia. It is one of three examples of the royal architecture of Numidia, which is in a good state of preservation and dates to the 2nd century BC. It was restored by the government of French Tunisia between 1908-10.

As part of the site of Dougga, the mausoleum is listed by UNESCO as a World Heritage Site. On 17 January 2012, the Tunisian government proposed it be included in a future classification of the royal mausoleums of Numidia and Mauretania and other pre-Islamic funerary monuments.

History 

The first westerners to visit the site of Dougga arrived in the 17th century, becoming more frequent throughout the nineteenth century. The mausoleum was described by several of these tourists and was the object of early architectural studies at the end of the period.

In 1842, the British consul in Tunis Thomas Reade seriously damaged the monument in the process of removing the royal inscription which decorated it. The current state of monument is the result of a reconstruction of the pieces strewn through the surrounding area, carried out with Tunisian support by the French archaeologist  between 1908 and 1910.

Description 

The 21 m high mausoleum is divided into three levels, atop a five step pedestal.

On the north face of the podium, the first of the three levels, an opening covered by a slab leads to the funerary chamber. The mausoleum's other faces are decorated with false openings, the corners with Aeolic pilasters.

The sepulchre's second level consists of a colonnade in the form of a shrine (naiskos). The engaged columns on each side are of the ionic order. The third and final level is the most richly decorated: in addition to pilasters on the corners similar to those on the first level, it is capped by a pyramid. Sculptural elements have survived: griffons are perched on the corners and a quadriga on one of the faces of the upper level.

Bilingual Punic and Libyan inscription

The bilingual Numidian and Punic-Libyan Inscription now in the British Museum enabled the Numidian alphabet to be deciphered:

Interpretation 

The Libyo-Punic Mausoleum has often been connected with the funerary monuments of Asia Minor and necropolises of Alexandria of the 3rd and 2nd centuries BC.

On account of the inscription, the tomb is considered to be dedicated to Atban son of Iepmatah son of Palu. It has recently been determined that the inscription, which is located beside one of the false doors of the podium, was not unique. Another inscription, irreparably damaged, would have enumerated the titulare of the tomb's occupant.

According to recent studies, the names mentioned on the surviving inscription are merely the monument's builders: the architect and the various head artisans. The monument would have been built by the citizens of the city for a Numidian prince. It is thought to have possibly been a tomb or cenotaph intended for Massinissa.

See also 

 Royal Mausoleum of Mauretania
 Madghacen
 El Khroub
 Numidia
 Ancient Carthage

References

Bibliography 

 Gabriel Camps, « Dougga », Encyclopédie berbère, tome XVI, éd. Edisud, Aix-en-Provence, 1992, pp. 2522–2527 
 Gabriel Camps, Les Berbères, mémoire et identité, coll. Babel, éd. Actes Sud / Leméac, Arles / Montréal, 2007 
 Pierre Gros, L'architecture romaine du début du IIIe siècle av. J.-C. à la fin du Haut-Empire, tome 2 « Maisons, palais, villas et tombeaux », éd. Picard, Paris, 2001 
 Mustapha Khanoussi, Dougga, éd. Agence de mise en valeur du patrimoine et de promotion culturelle, Tunis, 2008 
 Edward Lipinski [sous la dir. de], Dictionnaire de la civilisation phénicienne et punique, éd. Brépols, Paris, 1992 
 Louis Poinssot, « La restauration du mausolée de Dougga », CRAI, vol. 54, 9, 1910, pp. 780–787 (online)
 Jan-Willem Salomoson & Claude Poinssot, « Le mausolée libyco-punique de Dougga et les papiers du comte Borgia », CRAI, vol. 103, 2, 1959, pp. 141–149 (online)
 Hédi Slim & Nicolas Fauqué, La Tunisie antique. De Hannibal à saint Augustin, éd. Mengès, Paris, 2001 

Mausoleums in Tunisia
Archaeological sites in Tunisia
Cemeteries in Tunisia
Kingdom of Numidia
Berber architecture
Dougga